Gercimar Maximiliano de Matos Junior (born August 28, 1990), known as Gercimar, is a Brazilian footballer who plays for São Caetano as midfielder.

Career statistics

References

External links

1990 births
Living people
Brazilian footballers
Association football midfielders
Campeonato Brasileiro Série B players
Campeonato Brasileiro Série D players
Associação Atlética Ponte Preta players
Guaratinguetá Futebol players
Clube de Regatas Brasil players
América Futebol Clube (RN) players
Rio Branco Esporte Clube players
Ituano FC players
Associação Desportiva São Caetano players